Sven Montan (22 July 1887 – 29 May 1971) was a Swedish diver. He competed in the men's plain high diving event at the 1912 Summer Olympics.

References

External links
 

1887 births
1971 deaths
Swedish male divers
Olympic divers of Sweden
Divers at the 1912 Summer Olympics
Divers from Stockholm